A fifth column is any group of people who undermine a larger group or nation from within, usually in favor of an enemy group or another nation. According to Harris Mylonas and Scott Radnitz, "fifth columns" are “domestic actors who work to undermine the national interest, in cooperation with external rivals of the state." The activities of a fifth column can be overt or clandestine. Forces gathered in secret can mobilize openly to assist an external attack. This term is also extended to organised actions by military personnel. Clandestine fifth column activities can involve acts of sabotage, disinformation, espionage, and/or terrorism executed within defense lines by secret sympathizers with an external force.

Origin
The term "fifth column" originated in Spain (originally quinta columna) during the early phase of the Spanish Civil War. It gained popularity in the Loyalist faction media in early October 1936 and immediately started to spread abroad.

The exact origins of the term are not clear. Its first known appearance is in a secret telegram dated September 30, 1936, that was sent to Berlin by the German chargé d'affaires in Alicante, Hans Hermann Völckers. In the telegram, he referred to an unidentified "supposed statement by Franco" that "is being circulated" (apparently in the Republican zone or in the Republican-held Levantine zone), and he suggests that in that statement Franco had claimed that there were four Nationalist columns approaching Madrid, and a fifth column waiting to attack from the inside. The telegram was part of the secret German diplomatic correspondence and was discovered long after the civil war.

The first identified public use of the term is in the October 3, 1936, issue of the Madrid Communist daily Mundo Obrero. In a front-page article, the party propagandist Dolores Ibárruri referred to a statement very similar (or identical) to the one that Völckers had referred to in his telegram, but attributed it to General Emilio Mola rather than to Franco. On the same day, the PCE activist Domingo Girón made a similar claim during a public rally. During the next few days, various Republican papers repeated the story, but with differing detail; some attributed the phrase to General Queipo de Llano. By mid-October, the media was already warning of the "famous fifth column".

Historians have never identified the original statement referred to by Völckers, Ibárruri, Girón, de Jong, and others. The transcripts of Francisco Franco's, Gonzalo Queipo de Llano's, and Emilio Mola's radio addresses have been published, but they do not contain the term, and no other original statement containing this phrase has ever surfaced. A British journalist who took part in Mola's press conference on October 28, 1936, claimed that Mola referred to quinta columna on that day, but by that time the term had already been being used in the Republican press for more than three weeks.

Historiographic works offer differing perspectives on authorship of the term. Many scholars have no doubt about Mola's role and refer to "fifth column" as "a term coined in 1936 by General Emilio Mola", though they acknowledge that his exact statement cannot be verified. In some sources, Mola is named as a person who had used the term during an impromptu press interview, and different - though detailed - versions of the exchange are offered. Probably the most popular version describes the theory of Mola's authorship with a grade of doubt, either noting that it is presumed but has never been proven, or that the phrase "is attributed" to Mola, who "apparently claimed" so, or else noting that "la famosa quinta columna a la que parece que se había referido el general Mola" (the famous fifth column that General Mola seems to have referred to) Some authors consider it possible if not likely that the term has been invented by the Communist propaganda with the purpose of either raising morale or providing justification for terror and repression; initially it might have been part of the whispering campaign, but was later openly floated by Communist propagandists. There are also other theories afloat.

Some writers, mindful of the origin of the phrase, use it only in reference to military operations rather than the broader and less well-defined range of activities that sympathizers might engage in to support an anticipated attack.

Second World War

By the late 1930s, as American involvement in the war in Europe became more likely, the term "fifth column" was commonly used to warn of potential sedition and disloyalty within the borders of the United States. The fear of betrayal was heightened by the rapid fall of France in 1940, which some blamed on internal weakness and a pro-German "fifth column". A series of photos run in the June 1940 issue of Life magazine warned of "signs of Nazi Fifth Column Everywhere". In a speech to the House of Commons that same month, Winston Churchill reassured MPs that "Parliament has given us the powers to put down Fifth Column activities with a strong hand." In July 1940, Time magazine referred to talk of a fifth column as a "national phenomenon".

In August 1940, The New York Times mentioned "the first spasm of fear engendered by the success of fifth columns in less fortunate countries". One report identified participants in Nazi "fifth columns" as "partisans of authoritarian government everywhere", citing Poland, Czechoslovakia, Norway, and the Netherlands. During the Nazi invasion of Norway, the head of the Norwegian fascist party, Vidkun Quisling, proclaimed the formation of a new fascist government in control of Norway, with himself as Prime Minister, by the end of the first day of fighting. The word "quisling" soon became a byword for "collaborator" or "traitor".

The New York Times on August 11, 1940, featured three editorial cartoons using the term. John Langdon-Davies, a British journalist who covered the Spanish Civil War, wrote an account called The Fifth Column which was published the same year. In November 1940, Ralph Thomson, reviewing Harold Lavine's Fifth Column in America, a study of Communist and fascist groups in the U.S., in The New York Times, questioned his choice of that title: "the phrase has been worked so hard that it no longer means much of anything."

Immediately following the Japanese attack on Pearl Harbor, U.S. Secretary of the Navy Frank Knox issued a statement that "the most effective Fifth Column work of the entire war was done in Hawaii with the exception of Norway." In a column published in The Washington Post, dated 12 February 1942, the columnist Walter Lippmann wrote of imminent danger from actions that might be taken by Japanese Americans. Titled "The Fifth Column on the Coast", he wrote of possible attacks that could be made along the West Coast of the United States that would amplify damage inflicted by a potential attack by Japanese naval and air forces. Suspicion about an active fifth column on the coast led eventually to the internment of Japanese Americans.

During the Japanese invasion of the Philippines, an article in the Pittsburgh Post-Gazette in December 1941 said the indigenous Moro Muslims were "capable of dealing with Japanese fifth columnists and invaders alike". Another in the Vancouver Sun the following month described how the large population of Japanese immigrants in Davao in the Philippines welcomed the invasion: "the first assault on Davao was aided by numbers of Fifth Columnists–residents of the town".

Later usage

 German minority organizations in Czechoslovakia formed the Sudeten German Free Corps, which aided Nazi Germany. Some claimed they were "self-defense formations" created in the aftermath of World War I and unrelated to the German invasion two decades later. More often their origins were discounted and they were defined by the role they played in 1938–39: "The same pattern was repeated in Czechoslovakia. Henlein's Free Corps played in that country the part of fifth column".
 In 1945, a document produced by the U.S. Department of State compared the earlier efforts of Nazi Germany to mobilize the support of sympathizers in foreign nations to the superior efforts of the international communist movement at the end of World War II: "a communist party was in fact a fifth column as much as any [German] Bund group, except that the latter were crude and ineffective in comparison with the Communists". Arthur M. Schlesinger Jr., wrote in 1949: "the special Soviet advantage—the warhead—lies in the fifth column; and the fifth column is based on the local Communist parties".
 Zainichi Koreans living in Japan, particularly those affiliated with the organization Chongryun (which is itself affiliated with the government of North Korea) are sometimes seen as a "fifth column" by some Japanese, and have been the victims of verbal and physical attacks. These have occurred more frequently since the government of Kim Jong Il acknowledged it had abducted Japanese citizens from Japan and tested ballistic missiles near the waters of and over mainland Japan.
 A significant number of Israeli Arabs, who compose approximately 20% of Israel's population, identify more with the Palestinian cause than with the State of Israel or Zionism. As a result, many Israeli Jews, including politicians, rabbis, journalists, and historians, view them (and/or the main Israeli Arab political group, the Joint List) as a fifth column.
 Counter-jihad literature has sometimes portrayed Western Muslims as a "fifth column", collectively seeking to destabilize Western nations' identity and values for the benefit of an international Islamic movement intent on the establishment of a caliphate in Western countries. Following the 2015 attack by French-born Muslims on the offices of Charlie Hebdo in Paris, the leader of the UK Independence Party Nigel Farage said that Europe had "a fifth column living within our own countries". In 2001, Dutch politician Pim Fortuyn talked about Muslim immigrants being a "fifth column", on the night he was dismissed as leader of Liveable Netherlands.

 In 2022, Russian president Vladimir Putin called Russian citizens who are against the invasion of Ukraine as fifth columnists and "national traitors."

In popular culture
The title of Ernest Hemingway's only play "The Fifth Column" (1938) is a translation of General Mola's phrase, la quinta columna. In early 1937 Hemingway had been in Madrid, reporting the war from the loyalist side, and helping make the film The Spanish Earth. He returned to the US to publicise the film and wrote the play, in the Hotel Florida in Madrid, on his next visit to Spain later that year.

In the US, an Australian radio play, The Enemy Within, proved to be very popular, though this popularity was due to the belief that the stories of fifth column activities were based on real events. In December 1940, the Australian censors had the series banned.

British reviewers of Agatha Christie's novel N or M? in 1941 used the term to describe the struggle of two British partisans of the Nazi regime working on its behalf in Britain during World War II.

In Frank Capra's film Meet John Doe (1941), newspaper editor Henry Connell warns the politically-naïve protagonist, John Doe, about a businessman's plans to promote his own political ambitions using the apolitical John Doe Clubs. Connell says to John: "Listen, pal, this fifth-column stuff is pretty rotten, isn't it?", identifying the businessman with anti-democratic interests in the United States. When Doe agrees, he adds: "And you'd feel like an awful sucker if you found yourself marching right in the middle of it, wouldn't you?"

Alfred Hitchcock's Saboteur (1942) features Robert Cummings asking for help against "fifth columnists" conspiring to sabotage the American war effort. Soon the term was being used in popular entertainment.

Several World War II era animated shorts include the term. Cartoons of Porky Pig asked any "fifth columnists" in the audience to leave the theater immediately. In Looney Tunes' Foney Fables, the narrator of a comic fairy tale described a wolf in sheep's clothing as a "fifth columnist". There was a Merrie Melodies cartoon released in 1943 titled The Fifth-Column Mouse. Comic books also contained references to the fifth column.

Graham Greene, in The Quiet American (1955) uses the phrase "Fifth Column, Third Force, Seventh Day" in the second chapter.

In the 1959 British action film Operation Amsterdam, the term "fifth columnists" is used repeatedly to refer to Nazi sympathizing members of the Dutch Army.

The V franchise is a set of TV shows, novels and comics about an alien invasion of Earth. A group of aliens opposed to the invasion and assist the human Resistance Movement is called The Fifth Column.

In the episode "Flight Into the Future" from the 1960s TV show Lost In Space, Dr. Smith was referred to as the fifth columnist of the Jupiter 2 expedition. In the first episode, he was a secret agent sent to sabotage the mission who got caught on board at liftoff.

There is an American weekly news podcast called "The Fifth Column", hosted by Kmele Foster, Matt Welch, Michael C. Moynihan, and Anthony Fisher.

Robert A. Heinlein's 1941 story "The Day After Tomorrow", originally titled "Sixth Column",
refers to a fictional fifth column that 

In Foyle's War, Series 2 Episode 3, "War Games", one line reads, "It's the Second salvage collection I've missed, they've got me down as a fifth columnist."

See also
 Alien infiltration
 Black propaganda
 Copperhead (politics)
 Demographic threat
 Entryism
 False flag
 Front organization
 Internal enemy
 Jash (term)
 Quisling
 Sleeper cell
 Stay-behind

Notes

References

Further reading

 
 
 
 
 Britt G. The Fifth column is Here / George Britt. New York: Wilfred Funk, Inc.,1940 125 p.
 Lavine H. Fifth column in America / Harold Lavine (1915-). New York: Doubleday, Doran, Incorporated, 1940 240 pp.

1936 introductions
1930s in Madrid
1936 in Spain
Articles containing video clips
Deep politics
Intelligence operations by type
Irregular military
Psychological warfare techniques
Spanish Civil War
Urban guerrilla warfare tactics